Frazin is a surname. Notable people with the surname include:

Gladys Frazin (1900–1939), American actress
Howard Frazin (born 1962), American composer
Judith R. Frazin (born 1942), American genealogist